Roch Voisine (also known as On the Outside as per the first track on the album) is a 1990 album by Canadian singer Roch Voisine. It has the same content as the English tracks of his  bilingual French / English double album entitled Double released the same year. It provided two singles in France, which achieved moderate success in comparison with the singer's previous singles : "On the Outside" (#10) and "Waiting" (#16).

Its chart performances and certifications were probably merged to the singer's previous album, Double, as its content is partially the same as that of the double album. Therefore, the album debuted at #4 on 6 December 1990 on the SNEP Albums Chart and had a peak at number two for two weeks. It totaled 26 weeks in the top ten and 73 weeks in the top 50. In 1992, the album earned a 2 x Platinum disc for over 600,000 copies sold.

Track listing
 "On the Outside" (Campbell, Voisine) — 4:03
 "Waiting" (Voisine) — 3:28
 "Mountain Girl" (Lessard, Voisine) — 3:37
 "A Fishing Day" (Voisine) — 4:09
 "My Fairy Tale" (Campbell, Voisine) — 2:58
 "She Had a Dream" (Voisine) — 3:32
 "Until Death Do Us Part" (Francis Cabrel, Campbell, Voisine) — 3:17
 "Jamie's Girl" (Campbell, Voisine) — 2:25
 "Pretty Face" (Voisine) — 3:16
 "Helen" (English version) (Lessard, Voisine) — 3:43
 "All Wired Up" (Voisine) — 4:00

Personnel
 Pastelle - artwork
 Manuel "Manu" Guiot, Serge "Bum-Bum" Pauchard - mixing
 Bruno Sourice - assistant mixing
 Paul Vincent - management
 Tony Frank - photo
 André Di Cesare, Roch Voisine -  producer
 Michael Delaney - recording
 Christophe Jauseau, Luc Pellerin, Stanislas BC - assistant recording
 Philippe Laffont - strings recording
 Claude Pons, Philippe Laffont - vocals and backing vocals recording

References

External links
Roch Voisine Official site album page

1990 albums
Roch Voisine albums